The Mangart road,, at 2,055 m, is the highest road in Slovenia. It is the access road from Log pod Mangartom to the Mangart pass at Mangart. It was built in late 1930s.

See also
 List of highest paved roads in Europe
 List of highest paved roads in Europe by country
 List of mountain passes

References

Roads in Slovenia